All at Sea is a 1933 American black and white film directed by E.H. Kleinert and written by Ballard MacDonald.

Cast
 Vincent Lopez as Himself - Orchestra Leader
 Joe Laurie Jr. as Himself - Writer
 Hugh O'Connell as Himself - Comedian
 Ethel Barrymore Colt as Herself - Daughter of Ethel Barrymore
 William O'Neill as Himself
 Pat Rooney as Himself - Comedian
 Ann Lester as Herself
 Hal Forde as Himself
 Phil Regan as Himself - Vocalist
 Gregory Stone as Himself - Composer
 Minor & Root as Themselves - Dancers
 Three X Sisters as Themselves - Vocal Trio

References

External links
 

1933 films
American black-and-white films
Universal Pictures films
Films shot in New York City